Jean Henri Latude (23 March 1725 – 1 January 1805), often called Danry or Masers de Latude, was a French writer famous for his lengthy confinement in the Bastille, at Vincennes, and for his repeated escapes from those prisons.

Life
He was born at Montagnac in Gascony. He received a military education and went to Paris in 1748 to study mathematics. He led a dissipated life and endeavoured to curry favor with Madame de Pompadour by secretly sending her a box of poison and then informing her of the supposed plot against her life, hoping that he could earn a reward of cash for warning her. The ruse was discovered, and Mme de Pompadour, not appreciating the humor of the situation, had Latude put in the Bastille on 1 May 1749.

He was later transferred to Vincennes, from which he escaped in 1750. Captured and reimprisoned in the Bastille, he made a second brief escape in 1756. He was again transferred to Vincennes in 1764, and the next year made a third escape and was a third time recaptured. He was put into the Charenton asylum by Malesherbes in 1775, and discharged in 1777 on condition that he should retire to his native town.

He remained in Paris, however, and he was again imprisoned. A certain Madame Legros became interested in him through a chance reading of one of his memoirs, and, through vigorous agitation in his behalf, secured his release in 1784. His considerable ability for mimicry and intrigue were evidenced throughout his long captivity; he posed as a brave military officer, a son of the non-existent marquis de La Tude, and as a victim of Pompadour's nefarious intrigues. He was lauded and pensioned during the Revolution, and, in 1793, the Convention compelled the heirs of Madame de Pompadour to pay him 60,000 francs in damages. He died famous and wealthy in Paris in 1805.

Work 
The principal work of Latude is the account of his imprisonment, written in collaboration with Jean-Yrieix de Beaupoil de Saint-Aulaire entitled Le Despotisme dévoilé, ou Mémoires de Henri Masers de la Tude, détenu pendant trente-cinq ans dans les diverses prisons d'état (Ostensibly Amsterdam, but actually published in Paris, 1787).  An English translation of a portion of this work (Despotism Unveiled: or the Memoirs of Latude, Detained for Thirty-five Years in the Various Prisons of the State) was published in 1787. Latude himself denied both the authorship and the accuracy of the pamphlet,  but it enjoyed a considerable popularity at the time of the French Revolution. Latude also wrote essays on a wide variety of subjects.

Britannica references
 Claude Quetel, Escape from the Bastille: The Life and Legend of Latude (Palgrave Macmillan, 1990) 
 J. F. Barrire, Mémoires de Linguet et de Latude (1884)
 G. Bertin, Notice in edition of the Mémoires (1889)
 F. Funck-Brentano, "Latude", in the Revue des deux mondes (1 October 1889)

References

External links
 
 

1725 births
1805 deaths
18th-century French criminals
French male non-fiction writers
French male criminals
Prisoners of the Bastille
18th-century French memoirists